Kuzminskoye is a rural locality (a village) in Kharovskoye Rural Settlement, Kharovsky District, Vologda Oblast, Russia. The population was 27 as of 2002.

Geography 
Kuzminskoye is located 21 km southwest of Kharovsk (the district's administrative centre) by road. Teterikha is the nearest rural locality.

References 

Rural localities in Kharovsky District